In computing, the Java Secure Socket Extension (JSSE) is a Java API and a provider implementation named SunJSSE that enable secure Internet communications in the Java Runtime Environment. It implements a Java technology version of the Secure Sockets Layer (SSL) and the Transport Layer Security (TLS)  protocols. It includes functionality for data encryption, server authentication, message integrity, and optional client-authentication. 

JSSE was originally developed as an optional package for Java versions 1.2 and 1.3, but was added as a standard API and implementation into JDK 1.4.

See also
 Java KeyStore

References

External links
 
 
 
 

Java APIs
Transport Layer Security implementation